Enforcer or enforcers may refer to:

Arts, entertainment and media

Comics
 Enforcer (comics), a Marvel Comics character
 Enforcers (comics), a Marvel Comics team
 New Enforcers, another Marvel Comics team

Film and television
 The Enforcer (1951 film), a 1951 film starring Humphrey Bogart
 The Enforcer (1976 film), third 'Dirty Harry' film starring Clint Eastwood
 My Father Is a Hero (1995) or The Enforcer, a film starring Jet Li
 The Enforcer (2022 film), an American action thriller film
 Enforcers (SWAT Kats), Megakat city's paramilitary police force in the animated television series

Gaming
 X-COM: Enforcer (2001), a third-person shoot'em up game
 Enforcer, a boss in the game Coded Arms (2005)
 Enforcer, a special Sentinel who appears in Halo 2 (2004)
 PAX Enforcers, volunteer staff of the Penny Arcade Expo
 The Enforcer, the main character in the computer game MegaRace (1993)
 Enforcers (role-playing game), a 1987 role-playing game

Music
 Enforcer (band), a Swedish heavy metal band
 "CBS Enforcer", a bumper music package written by Frank Gari used by local CBS television stations

Crime, law enforcement and military
 Enforcer (battering ram), a manual battering ram used by British Police forces
 Law enforcer, a person empowered by the state to enforce the law
 Mob enforcer, a member of a group, especially of a criminal gang, who performs contract killings or is charged with keeping dissident members obedient
 Enforcer, a shoulder-launched guided rocket weapon being developed by MBDA

Sports
 Enforcer (ice hockey), a role in ice hockey
 Enforcer (professional wrestling), a wrestler who accompanies another to matches, and acts as a bodyguard
 Chicago Enforcers, a former American football team in the short-lived XFL
 The Enforcers (professional wrestling), a wrestling team

Transportation
 Enforcer (ship design), a naval vessel for carrying expeditionary forces
 MH-90 Enforcer, a helicopter
 Piper PA-48 Enforcer, an airplane based on the P-51 Mustang

People
 Arn Anderson (born 1958), American professional wrestler, nicknamed "The Enforcer"
 Maurice Lucas (1952-2010), American basketball player and later coach, nicknamed "The Enforcer"

Other uses
 Enforcement, the process of ensuring compliance with laws, regulations, rules, standards, or social norms
 Enforcer, a cut down pistol configuration of the M1 carbine made by Iver Johnson

See also
 The Enforcers (disambiguation)